Mindwarp is the second serial of the larger narrative known as The Trial of a Time Lord which encompasses the whole of the 23rd season of the British science fiction television series Doctor Who. It was first broadcast in four weekly parts on BBC1 from 4 to 25 October 1986. The title Mindwarp is not used on screen and appears only on the serial's scripts with the four episodes that comprise the story being transmitted as The Trial of a Time Lord Parts Five to Eight. This story marks the final appearance of Nicola Bryant as Peri Brown.

In the serial, the alien time traveller the Sixth Doctor (Colin Baker) is put on trial by his people, the Time Lords, and is accused of meddling in the affairs of the planet Thoros Beta in the 24th century. Much of the story consists of a video testimony presented by the prosecutor – the Valeyard (Michael Jayston) – of the doctor discovering the alien arms dealer Sil (Nabil Shaban) is looking for a way to prolong the life of Lord Kiv (Christopher Ryan) by transplanting Kiv's mind into another.

Plot

As with the other serials from Season 23, Mindwarp is framed by the trial of the Sixth Doctor, prosecuted by the Valeyard, accusing him of meddling in other species' affairs in a way unbecoming of a Time Lord. The Valeyard provides evidence to the presiding Inquisitor via a screen linked to the Matrix showing the details of the Doctor's actions on the planet Thoros Beta. The bulk of the episode centres on recorded narrative.

As shown by the video, the Doctor and Peri arrive on Thoros Beta, the Doctor's curiosity piqued on the availability of advanced weaponry by the Warlords of Thordon. As they explore a cave system, the Doctor discovers Sil, an arms dealer for the Mentors that are supplying the weapons. Exploring further, they find that the scientist Crozier in Sil's employ is attempting to perfect the ability to transplant the brilliant mind of Kiv, Sil's superior, into another body to overcome Kiv's pending death. When discovered, the two make their escape with the warlord King Yrcanos, one of Crozier's test subjects.

The Doctor, Peri, Yrcanos and his men plan an attack on Sil, but the Doctor betrays them by abandoning them at the last minute and warns the Mentors, causing Peri and Yrcanos to flee in different directions. Peri happens across one of the Mentors' servant women, and with her help, disguises herself to get close to the Doctor. The Doctor reveals Peri to the Mentors and requests he be allowed to interrogate her alone, a request Sil allows. Away from the others, the Doctor tells Peri his betrayal was all a ploy to learn more of Sil's plan, and has discovered that they will transplant Kiv's mind into his body if he does not cooperate.

Crozier interrupts the interrogation, believing he can extract more information from Peri, but then Yrcanos arrives, ready to kill the Doctor. Peri stops Yrcanos, and together they escape, regrouping with Yrcanos' men. As Kiv's body is dying, Crozier is forced to transplant his brain with the Doctor's help into the body of one of the Mentors' servants, keeping the mind alive but affected by the simple thoughts of the former consciousness.  Yrcanos, Peri, and his men launch another attack, this time on a weapons stash, but are stunned and captured. Sil and Crozier decide to use Peri as a more suitable body for Kiv's brain, despite the Doctor's objections. As the operation is being prepared, the Doctor sneaks away and frees Yrcanos, urging him on for Peri's safety.

Peri is strapped down and gagged as the operation is prepared and Crozier gives the order for her head to be shaven. The Doctor attempts to return to save her but is suddenly drawn hypnotically into the TARDIS, which appears in the hallway; it is later revealed that he travelled directly to his trial from that point. Despite the Doctor claiming that the Time Lords' interference has put Peri's life in danger, the Valeyard rebuffs this, stating that the Doctor shouldn't have become involved in the first place, and Peri's life is the cost of his involvement. Events on Thoros Beta continue after the Doctor's removal, as it is shown that Ycranos was placed in a time bubble by the Time Lords to hold his arrival back at the lab until after Kiv's mind was successfully transplanted into Peri; when Yrcanos is freed of the bubble, he is distraught at the results of the operation, and fires wildly, killing Peri. The Valeyard insists that the interference of the Time Lords was to prevent a greater disaster befalling the universe due to the mistakes in the Doctor's actions. The Doctor insists that the present trial appears to be serving an ulterior motive, and resolves to determine what it is as the trial continues.

Production

Music
Initially it was intended that the BBC Radiophonic Workshop would provide music scores for both this and the following segment of The Trial of a Time Lord; both were assigned to Malcolm Clarke to begin with, although Terror of the Vervoids was reassigned to Elizabeth Parker shortly afterwards. However, fellow Radiophonic Workshop composer Jonathan Gibbs left early in 1986 and was not replaced until the following year, leaving the other composers backlogged and with no one free to do the incidental music for Mindwarp. It was suggested that Dick Mills could provide both the music and sound effects, but John Nathan-Turner rejected this idea and instead hired film composer Richard Hartley to create the incidental music for this segment. It would be the only time that Hartley worked on the series. The original recordings of Hartley's score no longer exist in the BBC archives with the result that there was no isolated score included on the DVD release of this story. For the Blu-Ray release of Season 23, Richard Hartley, along with Mark Ayres re-recorded the entire score in order to present the serial in a new 5.1 mix.

Cast notes
Deep Roy, who had previously played Mr. Sin in The Talons of Weng-Chiang, has an uncredited role as the Posicarian delegate. Trevor Laird returned to Doctor Who in the Tenth Doctor era as Clive Jones, father of the Doctor's companion Martha Jones. Christopher Ryan returned in 2008 as Sontaran leader General Staal in "The Sontaran Stratagem" and "The Poison Sky", and in 2010 as another Sontaran, Commander Strak, in "The Pandorica Opens".

Commercial releases

In print

A novelisation of this serial, written by Philip Martin, was published by Target Books in June 1989 and was the final segment of the Trial arc to be adapted. Martin's novelisation adds a joke ending that gives away the revelation regarding Peri's fate in The Ultimate Foe, suggesting an entirely different outcome for the character and for Yrcanos than is suggested in the serial.

Home media
In October 1993, this story was released on VHS as part of the three-tape The Trial of a Time Lord set. The Region 2 DVD was released on 29 September 2008, similarly boxed with the other three stories of this season. This serial was scheduled to be released as part of the Doctor Who DVD Files in Issue 130 on 25 December 2013.

These four episodes, along with the remaining 10 episodes, were released on blu-ray on 7 October 2019. Extended versions of these four episodes (along with extended versions of the remaining 10 episodes) were included as extras on Discs 5 & 6.

References

External links

Mindwarp at The Doctor Who Reference Guide

Target novelisation

Doctor Who serials novelised by Philip Martin
Sixth Doctor serials
1986 British television episodes
Fiction set in the 24th century